Choco District is one of fourteen districts of the province Castilla in Peru.

Geography 
The Chila mountain range traverses the district. Other mountains are listed below:

Ethnic groups 
The people in the district are mainly indigenous citizens of Quechua descent. Quechua is the language which the majority of the population (67.11%) learnt to speak in childhood, 32.23% of the residents started speaking using the Spanish language (2007 Peru Census).

References

Districts of the Castilla Province
Districts of the Arequipa Region